Revenge of the Green Dragons is a 2014 crime drama film directed by Andrew Lau and Andrew Loo, written by Michael Di Jiacomo and Andrew Loo, with Martin Scorsese as an executive producer. The film stars Justin Chon, Kevin Wu, Harry Shum Jr., Eugenia Yuan, Geoff Pierson and Ray Liotta.  The film is based on Frederic Dannen's New Yorker article that chronicled the true story of Chinese-American gang life in 1980s and 1990s New York City. The central villain Snake Head Mama is based on gangster Sister Ping.

Plot
An immigrant named Sonny (Chon) joined the Chinatown gang "The Green Dragons" when he was a kid, and worked his way up through the gang hierarchy. But as he quickly rose up the ranks and became notorious in the community, his life falls apart around him.

Cast

 Justin Chon as Sonny
 Alex Fox as Little Sonny
 Kevin Wu as Steven Wong
 Michael Gregory Fung as Little Steven
 Harry Shum Jr. as Paul Wong 
 Eugenia Yuan as Snake Head Mama
 Leonard Wu as Ah Chung
 Jin Au-Yeung as Detective Tang
 Jon Kit Lee as Teddy
 Shuya Chang as Tina
 Celia Szeming Au as Bobo
 Ron Yuan as Born to Kill Dai Lo
 Billy Magnussen as Detective Boyer
 Geoff Pierson as FBI Deputy Director Sam Higgins
 Ray Liotta as Michael Bloom

Production
Principal photography began in June 2013 in Chinatown, New York City. Scenes were filmed in some parts of Queens and Brooklyn, New York such as Elmhurst.

On November 2, 2013, Mark Kilian was hired to score the film. Varèse Sarabande released the original soundtrack album on October 27, 2014.

Release
The film had its world premiere on September 10, 2014 at the 2014 Toronto International Film Festival, and then went on to be screened at a number of other international film festivals. The film also received a day-and-date theatrical and VOD release in the United States on October 24, 2014. In December 2014, co-director Andrew Lau said that the film was able to make profit.

Reception
The film has received largely negative reviews from film critics. On Rotten Tomatoes, the film holds a rating of 15%, based on 26 reviews, with an average rating of 4.14/10. On Metacritic, the film has a score of 36 out of 100, based on 12 critics, indicating "generally unfavorable reviews".

However, co-director Andrew Loo had traveled all over the United States with the film, and said: "I've found that this is actually a real-audience film.....In terms of audience reception, I don't think we've ever had a 'bad' screening. It's interesting that the critics hate the film because it's not an easy film to watch. It's a genre film dressed up as an art house film because you have Marty's [Scorsese's] name on it."

References

External links
 
 
 
 
 

2014 films
2014 crime drama films
American crime drama films
Films directed by Andrew Lau
Films about Chinese Americans
Films set in New York City
Films shot in New York City
Triad films
IM Global films
A24 (company) films
Asian-American drama films
Chinese-language American films
2010s English-language films
2010s American films
2010s Hong Kong films